The Moroccan Workers' Union (UMT for Union marocaine du travail) is the oldest national trade union center in Morocco. With a membership of more than 306,000, UMT represents workers in both the private and public sectors of the economy.

In 1960 the General Union of Moroccan Workers (UGTM) split from the UMT. In 1963, UMT itself lapsed its membership in the International Confederation of Free Trade Unions, after the formation of the All-African Trade Union Federation, as a result of the AATUF's opposition to African membership in non-African organisations. 

In 1990, UMT re-affiliated itself to the ICFTU (now the International Trade Union Confederation).

References

Trade unions in Morocco
International Trade Union Confederation
Trade unions established in 1955
1955 establishments in Morocco